Pantelis "Linos" Gavriel (in Greek: Λίνος Γαβριήλ; born 1975) is a Cypriot-Greek professional basketball coach. He is the current head coach of US Monastir. 

Gavriel has been successful in Bahrain, Cyprus, Tunisia, among other countries during his career, winning championships with several local teams. He was also on the Cyprus men's national basketball team for three years.

Early life and education 
Born in London, Gavriel was raised in the Greek city of Thessaloniki, and became interested in basketball after seeing the Greece national team win gold at  EuroBasket 1987. He obtained a Bachelor's degree and Master's degree in physical education at Aristotle University of Thessaloniki. Gavriel later worked as a physical education professor at the University of Cyprus. He started coaching in 1997, while still being enrolled in university.

From 2001 to 2007, Gavriel worked for APOEL as assistant coach and the director of youth development. One of the players in the youth program of APOEL was Aleksandar Vezenkov, later to be a EuroLeague star player.

Coaching career 
Gavriel signed his first contract as head coach in 2006, taking over APOEL. After a year, he coached the AEL Limassol B.C. women's team for three seasons. In 2010, he switched to AEL Limassol men's team. 

In 2012, at age 36, Gavriel became the head coach of Étoile Sportive du Sahel, the then continental champions of Africa. He guided Sahel to the Championnat National A and Tunisian Cup titles in his first season with the team. After two seasons, he transferred to ES Radès.

From 2015 to 2017, Gavriel returned to Cyprus and coached AEK Larnaca and guided the team to the double (Cyprus Basketball Division A and Cypriot Cup). He also coached the team to a successful run in the FIBA Europe Cup, reaching the top 16 in the team's first-ever European season.

He had a short stint in Bahrain, coaching Al-Ahli Club Manama in the 2017–18 season. After this, Gavriel returned for a second period at ES Radès. He left the team in April, after losing to JS Kairouan in the 2019 FIBA Africa Basketball League.

In the 2019–20 season, Gavriel coached Panionios of the Greek Basket League after they signed him in October. The season was marked by the COVID-19 pandemic which led to the cancellation of the league and Panionios finishing in 12th place.

The following season, he coached Larisa who entered the Greek League with a wild card. 

After the season in Greece, Lavriel signed with Manama Club in the Bahraini Premier League, his second stint in the country. Manama won the national double, winning the Bahraini Premier League and the Bahraini Cup.

In October 2022, Gavriel became the head coach of US Monastir, defending BAL champions, replacing outgoing coach Marouan Kechrid. He coached Monastir in the 2023 FIBA Intercontinental Cup.

Cyprus national team 
In the autumn of 2017, he was assigned as head coach of the Cyprus men's national basketball team. He extended his contract again in October 2019, committing himself to the end of 2022.

Honours 
Manama Club

 Bahraini Premier League: (2022)
 Bahraini Cup: (2022)

ES Sahel

 Championnat National A: (2013)
 Tunisian Cup: (2013)
 FIBA Africa Clubs Champions Cup runners-up: (2013)
 Arab Club Basketball Championship: (2015)

AEK Larnaca

 Cyprus Basketball Division A: (2016)
 Cypriot Cup: (2017)

AEL Limassol women's team

 3× Cyprus Women's Division A: (2008, 2009, 2010)
 3× Cypriot Women's Cup: (2008, 2009, 2010)

References 

Cypriot basketball coaches
Basketball players from Thessaloniki
1975 births
Living people
US Monastir basketball coaches

APOEL B.C. coaches
AEK Larnaca B.C. coaches
Panionios B.C. coaches
Greek basketball coaches